Juan Carlos Pérez Frías (born 27 July 1956), known as Juan Carlos, is a Spanish former professional footballer who played as a midfielder.

Early life
Born in Madrid to hotel employee Pedro Pérez and his wife Isabel Frías, Juan Carlos and his ten siblings (eventually the couple fathered 12 children) moved with the family to Málaga at the age of 14.

Club career
Nacho played for CD Málaga during nine professional seasons, achieving promotions to La Liga in 1979 and 1982. He made his debut in the competition on 26 March 1977 in a 1–2 away loss against RC Celta de Vigo, and scored his first goal the following weekend to help the hosts defeat Real Sociedad by the same scoreline.

Having been relegated at the end of the 1984–85 campaign, the 29-year-old Juan Carlos left the La Rosaleda Stadium. After retiring, he worked with his brother as the club's doctor.

Personal life
Juan Carlo's brother and nephew, respectively José Ignacio and Ignacio, were also footballers. They too played for Málaga.

References

External links

Stats at Amigos Malaguistas  

1956 births
Living people
Footballers from Madrid
Spanish footballers
Association football midfielders
La Liga players
Segunda División players
Tercera División players
Atlético Malagueño players
CD Málaga footballers
CA Marbella footballers
Spanish sports physicians
Málaga CF non-playing staff